B60 may refer to :
 HLA-B60, an HLA-B serotype
 B60 (New York City bus) in Brooklyn
 Sicilian, Richter-Rauzer, Encyclopaedia of Chess Openings code
 Bundesstraße 60, a German road
 a United Kingdom postcode area covering the town of Bromsgrove, Worcestershire
 Rolls-Royce B60 Engine, an inline-six petrol engine primarily used in the Daimler Ferret armoured car
 Bruxner Highway has route number B60 between Ballina and Tenterfield in New South Wales, Australia

B-60 may refer to :
 Convair YB-60, an American aircraft